Rory Allen Phillips is an American musician and founding member of Austin, Texas punk-ska band The Impossibles. Phillips also started The Stereo with Jamie Woolford of Animal Chin in 1999, and Slowreader with Impossibles bandmate Gabe Hascall in 2001. Phillips's current band is the reassembled The Stereo who, in 2022, self-released the album Thirteen and a podcast detailing the rise and fall of The Stereo called Kings of No Hope. Some of his side projects include Imbroco's "Are You My Lionkiller?"; the 20goto10; Nineteen Ninety-Now; Amex; a 2000-2005 mixtape under Rory Allen Phillips; and The Artificial Heart.

Rory has also produced, mixed or mastered albums by Young Love, Recover, At All Cost, Soft, The Rise, Vise Versa, The Higher, Visitors, Old Coyote, Cruiserweight, Kissing Chaos, The Last Starfighter, White Lies and Armor For Sleep among other bands.

Discography

with The Impossibles
 The Impossibles (1997)
 Back 4 The Attack! (1998)
 Anthology (1999)
 Return (2000)
 Audio Catalog compilation CD (Fueled By Ramen, 2000)
 4 Song Brick Bomb (2001)
 Come Back/The Position (7 Inch) (2013)

with The Stereo
 Three Hundred (1999)
 Audio Catalog compilation CD (Fueled By Ramen, 2000)
 Thirteen (2022)

with Slowreader
 Slowreader (2002)

with The Artificial Heart
  The Artificial Heart (album) (2009)

References

External links
 Rory Phillips - BandToBand.com

Living people
Music of Austin, Texas
Musicians from Texas
Year of birth missing (living people)
Place of birth missing (living people)